Los Flamencos Sanctuary has been a designated wildlife sanctuary since 1977. It is located in the Guajira Peninsula of Colombia's Caribbean Region.

The sanctuary is located between the fishing village of Camarones and the Tapias River, surrounded by estuaries and marshes including Manzanillo, Laguna Grande, Ciénaga del Navío Quebrado and Tocoromanes marshes.

Many other shore and water birds can be found in the sanctuary such as roseate spoonbills, great egrets, laughing gulls and many others.  The surrounding xerophytic scrub habitat is also home to many endemic birds such as buffy hummingbirds, white-whiskered spinetails, Tocuyo sparrows, and vermilion cardinals.

See also
 List of national parks of Colombia
 Caribbean Natural Region, Colombia

External links
Birding Colombia - Los Flamencos Sanctuary
 SFF Los Flamencos

National parks of Colombia
Bird sanctuaries
Protected areas established in 1977
Geography of La Guajira Department
Tourist attractions in La Guajira Department